The Lake Creek Settlement (ca. 1830s through the 1840s) was a settlement in Stephen F. Austin's Second Colony, located in Mexican Texas, and later the Republic of Texas after it gained independence in 1836.  The Lake Creek Settlement was located between the West Fork of the San Jacinto River (Texas) and the stream known as Lake Creek. It was the first Anglo-American settlement in what is today western Montgomery County, Texas.

In July 1837, the town of Montgomery, Texas was founded in the middle of the Lake Creek Settlement, at the site of W. W. Shepperd's store. It was located near the West Fork of the San Jacinto River, which had keel boat navigation to that point.

Background 

In 1821, Mexico gained independence from Spain. It formed a new nation from much of the lands that had comprised New Spain, including Spanish Texas. Because this area was sparsely populated, the Republic combined Texas with Coahuila to create a new state, Coahuila y Tejas.

The was had bankrupted the new Mexican government and it had little money to devote to the military. It authorized settlers to raise militias for their defense against hostile Indian tribes, who were seeking to expel the European Americans from their territory. Mexican Texas was raided by the Apache and Comanche, who were powerful in this area. Believing that an increase in settlers in the new state could help to deter the Indian raids, the Mexican government liberalized its immigration policies for the region. For the first time, it allowed settlers from the United States to Texas y Coahuila.

Anglo-American Stephen F. Austin became the first Empresario to successfully establish a colony in Texas. Under the 1823 Imperial Colonization Law of Mexico, an empresario could receive a land grant within the Mexican province of Texas. Together with a commissioner appointed by the governor, he was authorized to distribute land to settlers and issue them titles in the name of the Mexican government.  Only one contract was approved under this legislation, the first contract granted to Stephen F. Austin.

Between 1824 and 1828, Austin granted 297 titles under this contract. Each head of household received a minimum of 177 acres or 4,428 acres, depending on whether they intended to farm or raise livestock.  The grant could be increased for large families or those wishing to establish a new industry, but required the lands to be cultivated within two years. The settlers who received titles under Austin's first contract later became known as the Old Three Hundred. As many of these settlers came from the South, they brought enslaved African Americans with them to work and clear the land. As they developed cotton plantations in this area, they were dependent on the enslaved workers for it to be profitable.

The 1824 General Colonization Law made all heads of household who were citizens of or immigrants to Mexico eligible to claim land. The law did not differentiate among races or social status, but immigrants were required to be Roman Catholic, and foreigners were expected to learn Spanish. Persons who had been granted occupancy rights were allowed to claim the land patent for dwellings. Settlers were required to own property or have a craft or useful profession. All persons wishing to live in Texas were expected to report to the nearest Mexican authority for permission to settle.

The state government in Saltillo approved grants for land. They were soon besieged by foreign speculators wanting to bring colonists into the state.  Coahuila y Tejas implemented the federal law in 1825.  At this time, about 3500 people lived in Texas, mostly congregated at San Antonio and La Bahia.

Under the new law, people who did not already possess property in Texas could claim one square league of irrigable land, with an additional league available to those who owned cattle. Soldiers were given first choice of land, followed by Mexican citizens, and immigrants.  Empresarios and individuals with large families were exempt from the limit. Those who had owned land under Spanish control were allowed to retain their property as long as they had not fought with the Spanish during the Mexican War of Independence. Immigrants were subject to the same policies as Mexican citizens. Indians who migrated to Texas after Mexican independence and were not native to the area were to be treated as immigrants. Enslaved African Americans were not recognized as citizens or immigrants.

Establishment of Second Colony
On May 20, 1825, Stephen F. Austin obtained from the Mexican State of Coahuila y Texas a new contract, to introduce five hundred families to the area. It was signed on June 4, 1825. This contract was to be completed within six years. Order No. 24, dated March 7, 1827, defined the boundaries of Austin's Second Colony as follows:

The West Fork of the San Jacinto River was navigable by keel boat up to this area, which added to the area's desirability. Travel by water was the main method of transportation of persons and freight. Under the 1825 contract, Empresario Stephen F. Austin granted land to a number of Anglo-American colonists in 1831. Some of these settlers in Austin's Second Colony received leagues of land along the eastern boundary of the colony in what is today western Montgomery County; they were the first Anglo-American settlers in that county. Each of these leagues of land contained 4,428.4 acres.  Elias R. Wightman was the surveyor of all this territory. The chain carriers assisting him included, at various times, William Rankin, Mathew Hubert, John Corner, William Atkins, and James Rankin.

The early settlers who qualified and received a league of land included the following:

By 1833, this settlement between the West Fork of the San Jacinto River and the stream called Lake Creek had already become known throughout Mexican Texas as the "Lake Creek Settlement." It was also commonly referred to as the "neighborhood of Lake Creek," the "District of Lake Creek," the "Precinct of Lake Creek," or simply as "Lake Creek."

Growth 

After the first settlers received their land grants in 1831, more settlers began to arrive. These early families included: Cartwright, Chatham, Galbraith, Garret, Mock, Shepperd, Springer, and Worsham.

Stephen F. Austin's Register of Families describes a land grant to Thomas Chatham within the Lake Creek Settlement in 1834:

By 1835, the population of Lake Creek had become large enough to support a trading post.  William W. Shepperd, originally from North Carolina, purchased 200 acres of land on the John Corner League near the middle of the settlement. There he established the trading post that became known as "the store of W. W. Shepperd on Lake Creek." Shepperd's older brother Augustine Henry Shepperd served several terms as a US Congressman of the Whig Party representing North Carolina.

William Shepperd's store quickly became the meeting place and community center for area settlers. In 1835 John Bricker also built a mill and a cotton gin for Shepperd at the trading post site.

Texas Revolution 

When the Texas Revolution broke out, the Lake Creek Settlement was considered part of Washington Municipality. Several residents fought for independence against Mexico. These included Jacob H. Shepperd, Mathew Cartwright, William Cartwright, Thomas Chatham, Raleigh Rogers, Jacob Shannon, Evin Corner, John Marshall Wade, A. U. Springer, James J. Foster, and John Bricker. These soldiers fought in one or more battles, including the Powder House Fight, the Battle of Concepción, the Grass Fight, the Siege of Bexar, the battle on the Brazos River at San Felipe de Austin, and the Battle of San Jacinto.

John Marshall Wade manned one of the "Twin Sisters" cannon during the Battle of San Jacinto.

Jacob H. Shepperd had attended West Point as a young man but withdrew, and immigrated with his family to Texas. Shepperd fought in the Powder House Fight, the Battle of Concepción and the Siege of Bexar of the Revolution.  Shortly after the Revolution, he delivered a dispatch from General Sam Houston at Aies Bayou that saved the life of Mexican President Antonio López de Santa Anna. The latter was being held by the army, and was threatened with removal for a court-martial. This action was suspended on Houston's direction. Texas historian Henderson Yoakum credited Shepperd with carrying the document that protected Santa Anna.

Founding of Montgomery, Texas 

Following the Revolution, the Republic of Texas reorganized some areas. Among the new jurisdictions was Washington County, composed of six large precincts. One was named for the Lake Creek Settlement within these boundaries. Washington County Chief Justice, John P. Coles, provided the following description of the boundaries of Washington County to the Secretary of State of the Republic of Texas in early 1837:

In 1837, W. W. Shepperd, in association with John Wyatt Moody, founded the town of Montgomery, Texas at the site of Shepperd's store in the middle of Lake Creek Settlement. J. W. Moody was the First Auditor of the Republic of Texas and had been Auditor of the Provisional Government of Texas. They advertised sale of lots here in the 'Telegraph and Texas Register'', July 8, 1837, published in Houston, Texas.

Creation of Montgomery County 

On December 14, 1837, the Congress of the Republic of Texas passed an Act creating Montgomery County, Texas.  In the following weeks, the town of Montgomery, located in the center of the Lake Creek Settlement became the county seat of Montgomery County. Montgomery County was initially composed of three large political precincts that had previously formed eastern Washington County: the Viesca Precinct, the San Jacinto Precinct and the Lake Creek Precinct. The Viesca Precinct included most of the territory of present-day Grimes County, Texas (created 1846). The San Jacinto Precinct included most of the territory of present-day Walker County, Texas (created 1846). The Lake Creek Precinct included most of the territory of present-day Montgomery County, Texas.

An official Texas historical marker was approved by the Texas Historical Commission for the Lake Creek Settlement on January 29, 2016. On May 17, 2016, the Montgomery Independent School District Board of Trustees named the new MISD high school Lake Creek High School after the Lake Creek Settlement. The official Texas Historical Commission marker for the Lake Creek Settlement was dedicated at a ceremony in front of the Nat Hart Davis Museum and Pioneer Complex in Montgomery, Texas on February 25, 2017. Lake Creek High School, the second comprehensive high school in the Montgomery Independent School District, opened on August 21, 2018.

Footnotes

References 

 originally published 2004 by New York: Free Press

Further reading

External links 

History of the Lake Creek Settlement
The Early History of Montgomery, Texas
Stephen F. Austin's Second Colony Contract - June 4, 1825
John Wyatt Moody - Montgomery, Texas
Exciting Times as MISD’s New Schools Named
Lake Creek Settlement Marker Dedication Ceremony Program
Lake Creek Settlement: TSHA Handbook of Texas

Dewitt Colony
Republic of Texas